The 1941 Michigan Intercollegiate Athletic Association football season was the season of college football played by the six member schools of the Michigan Intercollegiate Athletic Association (MIAA) as part of the 1941 college football season.

The Alma Scots, led by head coach Gordon MacDonald, won the MIAC championship with a 6–0–1 record (4–0–1 against conference opponents) and outscored opponents by a total 131 to 19.

Conference overview

Teams

Alma

The 1941 Alma Scots football team represented Alma College of Alma, Michigan. In their sixth year under head coach Gordon MacDonald, the Scots compiled a 6–0–1 record (4–0–1 against MIAA opponents), won the MIAA championshpi, and outscored opponents by a total of 131 to 19.

Four Alma players were named to the All-Michigan Intercollegiate Athletic Association football team; quarterback Robert Kirby; end Keith Carey; tackle Edward Baklarz; and guard James Hicks.

Albion

The 1941 Albion Britons football team represented Albion College of Albion, Michigan. In their 19th year under head coach Dale R. Sprankle, the Britons compiled a 3–4–1 record (3–0–1 against MIAA opponents), finished in second place in the MIAA, and were outscored by a total of 118 to 52. The game between Albion and Hillsdale marked the 50th anniversary of the first football game between the schools, which was also the first football game in the MIAA.

Albion tackle Robert Fles was selected as a first-team player on the 1941 All-Star M.I.A.A. football team.

Hope

The 1941 Hope Flying Dutchmen football team represented Hope College of Hope, Michigan. In their 11th year under head coach Bud Hinga, the Dutchmen compiled a 3–2–3 record (2–1–2 against MIAA opponents), finished in third place in the MIAA, and were outscored by a total of 36 to 35.

Three Hope players were selected as first-team players on the 1941 All-Star M.I.A.A. football team: halfback Don Defouw; center William Tappen; and tackle Martin Bekken.

Kalamazoo

The 1941 Kalamazoo Hornets football team represented Kalamazoo College of Kalamazoo, Michigan. In their 17th and final year under head coach Chester S. Barnard, the Hornets compiled a 5–2–1 record (2–2–1 against MIAA opponents), finished in fourth place in the MIAA, and outscored opponents by a total of 68 to 38.

Hillsdale

The 1941 Hillsdale Dales football team was an American football team that represented Hillsdale College in the Michigan Intercollegiate Athletic Association (MIAA) during the 1941 college football season. In their 15th year under head coach Dwight Harwood, the Dales compiled a 3–4–1 record (1–3–1 against MIAA opponents), finished in fifth place out of six teams in the MIAA, and were outscored by a total of 89 to 51. '

Adrian

The 1941 Adrian Bulldogs football team represented Adrian College of Adrian, Michigan. In their fourth and final year under head coach Harve A. Oliphant, the Bulldogs compiled a 2–6 record (0–5 against MIAA opponents), finished in last place out of six teams in the MIAA, and were outscored by a total of 141 to 19.

All-conference team
The following players were selected as first-team players on the All-MIAA football team:

 Quarterback - Bob Kirby, Alma
 Fullback - Burr Manby, Hillsdale
 Halfbacks - William Johnston, Hillsdale; Don Defouw, Hope; Jack Bockleman, Kalamazoo
 Ends - Keith Carey, Alma; Gerald Gillman, Kalamazoo
 Tackles - Edward Baklarz, Alma; Martin Bekken, Hope; J. Clay, Kalamazoo; Robert Fles, Albion
 Guards - James Hicks, Alma; Robert Manby, Hillsdale
 Center - William Tappen, Hope

References